Big Man is the name of different fictional characters appearing in American comic books published by Marvel Comics.

Fictional character biography

Frederick Foswell

Frederick Foswell was the first person to assume the Big Man mantle. He used to be a reporter for the Daily Bugle, but in reality he lived a secret life as a criminal boss named Big Man. He was eventually defeated by Spider-Man after which he apparently turned new leaf. He died saving J. Jonah Jameson by taking a bullet for him.

Janice Foswell

Janice Foswell is the daughter of the original Big Man (Frederick Foswell) and sought to follow in her father's footsteps to gain control of the New York underworld. She was soon joined by a new Crime Master and Sandman.

She and her Enforcers were defeated by Spider-Man, the Human Torch and the Sons of the Tiger. Over a dispute about eliminating Spider-Man and the Sons, Janice was killed by the Crime Master who turned out to be her fiancé and son of the original Crime-Master (Nick Lewis Jr.) as both had separately pursued vengeance against Spider-Man without knowledge of each other's identity.

Frederick Foswell Jr.

Frederick Foswell Jr. is the son of Frederick Foswell and the brother of Janice Foswell. He took over the role to gain revenge for the death of his father and sister, which, owing to J. Jonah Jameson's then-hostile attitude towards Spider-Man, he blamed on the webslinger. Using one of Arcade's Murderworlds, Foswell Jr. attacked them with the Scorpion, Life Model Decoys of Human Fly, and replicas of the Spider-Slayers. Piloting a giant robot version of Big Man, he attacked Spider-Man and Jameson, assuming Jameson would help kill Spider-Man. Spider-Man and the remorseful Jameson quickly defeated Foswell Jr. as Spider-Man hurls the Big Man robot outside before it can self-destruct. Foswell Jr. is then arrested by the police.

Other versions

MC2
Henry Pym Jr. is the son of Hank Pym and Janet van Dyne in the MC2 universe. He inherits his father's size changing powers and takes the Big Man name. He is briefly a member of the Revengers before going straight and joining a government-sponsored team.

Ultimate Marvel
The Ultimate Marvel equivalent is named Mr. Big, a mobster and the Enforcers' leader. Mr. Big was scheming to overthrow Wilson Fisk, using Spider-Man as a secret weapon. The plan backfired, and when Fisk learned that he was the one responsible for Spidey's assault on Fisk's office, Fisk crushed the mobster's head bare-handed.

In other media
 A variation of the Big Man appears in The Spectacular Spider-Man as a mysterious crime lord alias initially for Tombstone (voiced by Keith David and Kevin Michael Richardson) and subsequently for the Green Goblin (voiced by Steve Blum).
 A variation of Henry Pym Jr. appears in Next Avengers: Heroes of Tomorrow, voiced by Aidan Drummond.

References

External links
 Janice Foswell at Marvunapp.com

Characters created by Bill Mantlo
Characters created by Sal Buscema
Comics characters introduced in 1975
Fictional crime bosses
Twin characters in comics
Marvel Comics supervillains
Marvel Comics female supervillains
Marvel Comics male supervillains
Articles about multiple fictional characters
Spider-Man characters